Miss Grand Paraguay 2021 was the 4th edition of the Miss Grand Paraguay pageant, held on July 3, 2021, at the Hotel Guaraní in Asunción. The contest featured twenty-two candidates, either chosen through regional pageants or through central casting, competed for the title, of whom the representative from Colonias Unidas, Jimena Sosa, was named the winner. She then represented Paraguay in the Miss Grand International 2021 pageant in Thailand, but got a non-placement.

Results

Contestants
22 contestants competed for the title.

References

External links

 

Miss Grand Paraguay
Beauty pageants in Paraguay
Paraguayan awards
Grand Paraguay